Mehdiabad (also Romanized as Mehdīābād) is a village in Shahr Meyan Rural District, in the Central District of Eqlid County, Fars Province, Iran. At the 2006 census, its population was 105, in 24 families.

References 

Populated places in Eqlid County